Love Me in Black is an EP by German hard rock singer Doro Pesch, released in Germany in 1998 by the WEA label. It was the first release by Doro with her new label, after her split with Vertigo, and preceded of a few weeks the eponymous album.

Track listing

Personnel
Doro Pesch – vocals
Jimmy Harry – guitars, bass, keyboards, programming, drum programming, producer, mixing, engineer
Fred Maher – programming, producer, engineer
Damon Weber – drums
Nick Douglas, Andrew Goodsight – bass

References

Doro (musician) EPs
1998 EPs